Corambis is a genus of South Pacific jumping spiders that was first described by Eugène Louis Simon in 1901.  it contains only two species, found only on the Loyalty Islands and New Caledonia: C. foeldvarii and C. insignipes.

References

Salticidae genera
Spiders of New Caledonia
Salticidae